Ashley Coleman (born 10 November 1981) is a former Miss Teen USA who won in 1999, representing her hometown of Camden and the state of Delaware. Coleman graduated from Caesar Rodney High School in 1999. Before winning her state title, she had modeled for Tommy Hilfiger, Rite Aid, and Johnson & Johnson, as well as Seventeen and Teen People. She was the first delegate from Delaware to win the national title.

Coleman won her first title, Miss Delaware Teen USA, in 1998 and reigned in Delaware until she won the Miss Teen USA 1999 title at Shreveport, Louisiana, on August 24, 1999. Coleman was crowned by Vanessa Minnillo of South Carolina and later gave up her title to Jillian Parry from Pennsylvania on August 26, 2000.

After winning Miss Delaware Teen USA, Coleman changed her plans to attend the University of Miami and instead took classes at Delaware State University, completing three years toward her degree in education. Before completing her final year, Coleman decided to take a break and attempt to enter the entertainment industry. She moved to Los Angeles in 2003.

In Los Angeles, Ashley appeared on The Price Is Right and pursued further modeling work. In 2006 she returned to the pageant scene, placing third runner-up to Tamiko Nash in the Miss California USA 2006 pageant.  She is only the second Miss Teen USA winner not to win a state title on her first attempt (the other being Miss Teen USA 1996, Christie Lee Woods of Texas).

References

Living people
1981 births
Miss Teen USA winners
1999 beauty pageant contestants
20th-century Miss Teen USA delegates
People from Camden, Delaware
Delaware State University alumni
20th-century American people